Liang Xingchu (23 August 1913 – 5 October 1985) was a People's Liberation Army lieutenant general. He was born in Ji'an County, Jiangxi Province. General Liang commanded the 38th group army during the Korean War. He died in Beijing.

References 

1913 births
1985 deaths
People's Liberation Army generals from Jiangxi
People from Ji'an
People of the Republic of China